The R168 road is a regional road in Ireland, linking Drogheda to the N2 at Collon, County Louth. 

Route
Southeast to northwest, the route starts at a junction with the R132 in Drogheda. It continues northwest joining the N51, crossing the M1 motorway and leaving the N51 at junction X to continue northwest to Collon.

See also
Roads in Ireland
National primary road
National secondary road

References
Roads Act 1993 (Classification of Regional Roads) Order 2006 – Department of Transport

Regional roads in the Republic of Ireland
Roads in County Louth